Yoon Myung-june (Hangul: 윤명준; born June 18, 1989) is a South Korean pitcher for the Doosan Bears of the KBO League. He bats and throws right-handed. Yoon was selected sixth overall by the Doosan Bears in the  KBO Draft.

Amateur career
As a sophomore at Korea University in  Yoon was promoted to the team's starting rotation. Yoon hurled one-run baseball over 7.1 innings and fanned 10 batters against reigning national champion Kyungsung University in his first 2009 season game as a starter. However, Yoon was sidelined with injuries for 3 months and finished the season with a 2.36 ERA and 45 strikeouts in 34.1 innings pitched.

Yoon broke out in  when he racked up 6 wins as a starter and posted a 0.85 ERA in 52.2 innings pitched. He led the national collegiate league in ERA, and was sixth in strikeouts (67) and seventh in wins. During the season, Yoon was selected for the South Korean national collegiate team and participated in the friendly baseball championship against the United States national baseball team and the 2010 World University Baseball Championship.

At the President's Flag Championship, Yoon led his team to the championship tossing a complete game shutout in the final game, and eventually earned the MVP honors. In September 2011, Yoon was called up to the South Korean senior national team for the 2011 Baseball World Cup held in Panama.

Notable international careers

External links
Career statistics and player information from Korea Baseball Organization

Yun Myeong-jun at Doosan Bears Baseball Club

Sportspeople from Gwangju
1989 births
Living people
South Korean baseball players
Doosan Bears players
KBO League pitchers
Korea University alumni